National Tertiary Route 619, or just Route 619 (or ) is a National Road Route of Costa Rica, located in the Guanacaste, Puntarenas provinces.

Description
In Guanacaste province the route covers Tilarán canton (Quebrada Grande, Cabeceras districts).

In Puntarenas province the route covers Puntarenas canton (Monte Verde district).

References

Highways in Costa Rica